Swarm Peak is a rock peak (610 m) which is the easternmost of the Birchall Peaks, in the Ford Ranges, Marie Byrd Land. Photographed from the air and roughly plotted by the Byrd Antarctic Expedition, 1928–30, but mapped definitively by the United States Antarctic Service (USAS), 1939–41. Named by Advisory Committee on Antarctic Names (US-ACAN) for H. Myron Swarm, United States Antarctic Research Program (USARP) ionospheric physicist at Byrd Station in the 1966–67 season.

Mountains of Marie Byrd Land